Roorkee railway station is a railway station in Haridwar district, Uttarakhand, India. Its code is RK. It serves Roorkee city. The station consists of three platforms. Roorkee is one of the largest railway stations in Uttarakhand.

Gallery

References

External links

Roorkee
Moradabad railway division
Railway stations in Haridwar district